Bengal Commercial Bank Limited is a fifth generation private commercial bank in Bangladesh. Md. Jashim Uddin, Vice Chairman of Bengal Group of Industries, is chairman of Bengal Commercial Bank Limited. Ghulam Mohammed Alomgir, the chairman of Max Group, is the vice chairman of Bengal Commercial Bank Limited.

History 
Bangladesh Bank provided a letter of intent to Bengal Commercial Bank Limited in February 2019 along with two other banks, Community Bank Bangladesh and Citizens Bank PLC. Bengal Commercial Bank Limited was established on 23 February 2020 by the Bengal Group of Industries. The Bank was originally called Bengal Bank. Bangladesh Bank initially opposed the license of the new bank as it believed the market was oversaturated. It relented following pressure from the government and the minister of finance, A. M. A . Muhith. In March 2021, the Minister of Finance, AHM Mustafa Kamal, inaugurated the bank at the Pan Pacific Sonargaon. Tarik Morshed was the first managing director of the bank and Md Jasim Uddin the chairman of the bank. KM Awlad Hossain was appointed the deputy managing director of the bank. It was the 60th bank in Bangladesh.

In May, chairman of the bank, Md. Jashim Uddin, was elected president of Federation of Bangladesh Chambers of Commerce and Industry. Bengal Commercial Bank Limited signed an agreement with Credit Rating Information and Services Limited in August for a credit rating of the bank. The bank had a net loss of 188 million taka in 2021.

Bengal Commercial Bank held their annual business conference in their headquarters in Gulshan in January 2022. Bengal Commercial Bank Limited signed an agreement with Jamuna Bank in June over licensing Visa. It signed an agreement with Bengal Islami life Insurance Limited in June. On 19 September 2022, Bengal Commercial Bank Limited signed a deal with Trust Bank to transfer money using Ria Money Transfer. It is also linked to the money transfer service of Nagad. In October Bengal Commercial Bank Limited signed an agreement with Babuland. It opened its 12th branch in Chittagong. It's 13th branch is in Keraniganj. It had a capital shortfall of 23 million taka.

References 

Banks of Bangladesh
Banks established in 2020
Banks of Bangladesh with Islamic banking services